The Safety Equipment Institute (SEI) is a private, non-profit organization established to administer non-governmental, third-party certification programs to test and certify a broad range of safety and protective products. As of April 2016, it became an affiliate of ASTM International, a global standards development organization.  It is accredited to ISO/IEC Guide 65:1996 by the American National Standards Institute (ANSI) and the Standards Council of Canada (SCC).  It works with assorted standards organizations to verify that various products meet the safety standards set for them.

See also
American National Standards Institute (ANSI)
International Organization for Standardization (ISO)
ASTM International

References

External links
 Safety Equipment Institute

Safety equipment